Chaotic is a trading card game / TV series franchise.
 Chaotic Trading Card Game
 Chaotic (TV series), an animated TV series 

Chaotic may also refer to:
 A state or phenomenon characterized by chaos
 Chaos theory
 Chaotic (novella), a 2006 novella by Kelley Armstrong
 Britney and Kevin: Chaotic, a short-lived 2005 reality TV series starring Britney Spears and Kevin Federline
 Britney & Kevin: Chaotic (EP), an EP by Britney Spears, made alongside the series, or its track "Chaotic"
 "Chaotic", a song by Loona Odd Eye Circle from the EP Mix & Match, 2017
 "Chaotic", a song by Tate McRae from the album I Used to Think I Could Fly
 Chaotic, a possible alignment in Dungeons and Dragons and related role-playing games

See also
 Chaos (disambiguation)
 Chaotics, a strategic business framework and platform for dealing with economic turbulence